Kenneth John Gonzales (born October 26, 1964) is an American attorney and jurist, currently serving as a United States district judge of the United States District Court for the District of New Mexico and is a former United States Attorney from the same district, who served in Albuquerque.

Early life and education

Gonzales was born and raised in Española, New Mexico. He earned a Bachelor of Arts degree in 1988 from the University of New Mexico and a Juris Doctor in 1994 from the University of New Mexico School of Law. He then attended The JAG School at the University of Virginia and entered the U.S. Army JAG Corps.

Career 
Gonzales worked as a law clerk for Chief Justice Joseph Baca of the New Mexico Supreme Court from 1994 to 1996. He served as a legislative assistant for United States Senator Jeff Bingaman from 1996 to 1999. From 1999 to 2010, he served as an Assistant United States Attorney for the District of New Mexico. In 2001 he was commissioned as an officer in the United States Army Reserve and holds the rank of major in the Army Judge Advocate General's Corps. He is an Adjunct Professor of Criminal Law at The Judge Advocate General's Legal Center and School. From 2010 to 2013, he served as United States Attorney for the District of New Mexico.

Federal judicial service 

On November 14, 2012, President Barack Obama nominated Gonzales to serve as a United States District Judge for the United States District Court for the District of New Mexico, to the seat vacated by Judge Bruce D. Black who assumed senior status on October 1, 2012. On January 2, 2013, his nomination was returned to the President, due to the adjournment sine die of the Senate. On January 3, 2013, he was renominated to the same office. His nomination was reported by the Senate Judiciary Committee on April 11, 2013, by a voice vote. On June 17, 2013, the Senate confirmed his nomination by a 89–0 vote. He received his commission on August 9, 2013 and took the judicial oath the same day. He commenced judicial duties on August 12, 2013. He maintains chambers in Las Cruces, New Mexico.

See also
List of Hispanic/Latino American jurists

References

External links

1964 births
Living people
21st-century American judges
Assistant United States Attorneys
Hispanic and Latino American judges
Judges of the United States District Court for the District of New Mexico
People from Española, New Mexico
United States Army reservists
United States Attorneys for the District of New Mexico
United States district court judges appointed by Barack Obama
University of New Mexico alumni
University of New Mexico School of Law alumni
The Judge Advocate General's Legal Center and School alumni